St. Francis Xavier's College (SFXC;  or  in short) is a Catholic secondary school for boys, located in Tai Kok Tsui, Yau Tsim Mong District, Kowloon, Hong Kong. The school in Kowloon was founded in 1955, having moved from Shanghai, China. Except for lessons in foreign languages and Chinese, most lessons are taught in English.

History
The school was founded by Jesuit Fathers in Shanghai in 1874, later in 1893 Marist Brothers were invited to teach in the college and took over full responsibility of it in 1895. Due to the religion policies of the Communist China, the Brothers were forced to leave Shanghai and moved to Hong Kong in 1949. The college was rebuilt and classes were resumed in Tai Kok Tsui at the junction of Maple Street and Sycamore Street (K.I.L. 6421) on 9 December 1955 and named St. Francis Xavier's College to emphasize the direct link with St. Francis Xavier's College, Shanghai.

Location
 the school has 56 teachers. The present principal is Mr. Leung Man Fai.

Students usually call themselves Xaverians.

The school motto is "Gentle in Manner, Resolute in Action". (Latin: Suaviter in modo Fortiter in re)

This school is one of the three in Hong Kong that allows students to wear different coloured sports shoes to school, which is its characteristic. There are only ten school regulations, and they mostly cover actions to be taken when regulations are broken.

Prayers
Students usually offer a short prayer before classes or in morning assemblies with 'Our Father', and will usually end the prayer with:

School badge

Middle
The Cross represents Jesus and the Catholic faith. It also means God is in every SFX activity.

Above left
Marist Brothers logo.

Above Right
Book represent knowledge and oil lamp represent light.

Below Right
White and green means purity and hope. These colours are also the representing colour of the school.

Below Left
「SFX」represents St. Francis Xavier, the Patron Saint of the school

Below
School motto
Latin: Suaviter in modo Fortiter in re;
;
English: Gentle in Manner, Resolute in Action

School song

Alumni

Politics and civil service
Francis Tam Pak Yuen (譚伯源),the Secretariat for Economy and Finance (Macau).
Kemal Bokhary (包致金), judge of Hong Kong's Court of Final Appeal.
Henry Fan Hung Ling (范鴻齡), SBS, JP, managing director of CITIC Pacific and the vice-chairman of Cathay Pacific Airways.

Business 

 Eric Edward Hotung (何鸿章), grandson of Robert Hotung, billionaire businessman, financier, and philanthropist

Entertainment and mass media
Bruce Lee (李小龍), internationally known martial arts instructor, actor, philosopher, film director, screenwriter, and martial arts founder.
Samuel Hui (許冠傑), first major superstar of Cantopop.
Eric Tsang (曾志偉), prolific Hong Kong actor, film director, film producer and television host.
Dicky Cheung Wai Kin (張衛健), Hong Kong television actor/singer.
Stephen Chan Chi-wan (陳志雲), former general manager of Television Broadcasts Limited.

See also
 St. Francis Xavier's School, Tsuen Wan
 Education in Hong Kong
 List of schools in Hong Kong
 List of Jesuit sites

References

External links

Educational institutions established in 1955
Secondary schools in Hong Kong
Boys' schools in Hong Kong
Marist Brothers schools
1955 establishments in Hong Kong